Amalka is a Slavic diminutive form of the female given name Amalia.

See also
 Eastern Slavic naming customs

References 

Given names
Slavic given names